"The Testament of Arkadia" is the twenty-third episode of the first series of Space: 1999.  The screenplay was written by Johnny Byrne; the director was David Tomblin.  The final shooting script is dated 5 February 1975, with a revised final shooting script dated 25 February 1975.  Live-action filming took place Tuesday 11 February 1975 through Tuesday 25 February 1975.

Story 
Late into the simulated Alpha 'night', John Koenig sits alone in his office, updating the official log.  As he reviews the past several days, the viewer can hear his thoughts courtesy of a voice-over narration.  He reflects on how their struggle to survive in a hostile universe had long erased casual recollection of the cataclysm that hurled the Moon out of Earth orbit; however, recent events on the planet Arkadia have revived this painful memory, as the Alphans were forced to reconsider their purpose in space.  The Commander's solemn words lead into an extended flashback...

Days earlier, an off-duty Koenig is in the gymnasium when an urgent summons to Main Mission interrupts his Kendo work-out with resident martial-arts enthusiast Luke Ferro.  The Moon has suddenly and inexplicably changed course; it is now heading directly for a solar system containing what may be habitable planet.  Long-range scanners are activated—and immediately malfunction; a sudden five-percent power loss is the cause of the failure.  The next minute, all personnel are hurled forward by a colossal lurch.  Incredibly, their forward motion is slowing.  Once in range of the planet, the Moon comes to a dead stop...

At an emergency meeting, Victor Bergman muses that, while gravity or magnetic forces could alter the Moon's speed or trajectory, neither could completely halt its progress.  Koenig is certain a third force, emanating from the planet, is responsible.  Reports come in on the mounting power loss:  diagnostics of the generators reveal no faults, but the energy output continues to drop.  To Koenig's frustration, Computer identifies the cause as 'external forces'.  If this trend continues, Moonbase Alpha will suffer a complete power failure in thirty-eight hours; a programme of power-conserving economies may provide an additional ten hours.

Their only chance for survival may be the planet.  With forty-eight hours of life-support remaining, Koenig quickly organises a survey mission.  The team will consists of himself, Bergman, Helena Russell, Alan Carter, two Security guards and two mission specialists to be selected by Computer.  These individuals will be chosen for having the widest range of relevant qualifications.  With the long-range systems affected, the survey team will have no access to Alpha's resources; all necessary equipment must be brought with them.

As the power loss climbs to thirteen percent, Eagle One departs.  Computer's additions to the team are aerospace engineer Luke Ferro and research supervisor Anna Davis.  An expert photographer, the Italian extrovert playfully snaps pictures of Anna as he tries to chat her up.  Not interested, the prim English girl tries to ignore him.  Later, she is embarrassed when she wakes from a nap with her head resting on his shoulder.  After a fifteen-hour flight, Eagle One arrives at the planet.  The preliminary data shows this world was devastated by a nuclear holocaust sometime in the distant past.

A low-altitude reconnaissance reveals no sign of life on the barren and inhospitable surface.  Though discouraged, Koenig and company touch down and make camp.  Keenly aware their very survival depends on any answers found, the Alphans then set off in teams of two across the desolate landscape.  While taking photo-scans of charred, leafless trees, Ferro experiences a growing trepidation—as if they were trespassing on sacred ground.  Anna has gathered some petrified leaf remnants; as she consults a botanical text, her excitement is seen to grow with each sample she examines.

Bergman and Helena's assessment of the environment is encouraging; the radiation levels are tolerable and the soil can be rejuvenated by introducing the proper bacteria and fungi.  Returning to camp, they come across a narrow cave opening.  The interior is oppressively silent but, as it may contain answers to their dilemma, they enter.  The two are shocked when their hand-torches illuminate a grisly tableau—a rough wooden table and benches occupied by a party of skeletons.

As the others assemble in the de facto crypt, Bergman makes another discovery.  Text inscribed on the rock wall resembles Sanskrit, an ancient Indo-European root language.  Helena recalls that polymath Anna is a trained philologist.  On arrival, Anna instantly forgets her undisclosed botanical discovery as she, too, recognises the text as Sanskrit—but a different, perhaps earlier form.  As she begins the herculean task of translating the passage without access to the reference library, Ferro is drawn to a skull at the head of the table.  He stares into the empty eye sockets as if mesmerised.

Forensic analysis of the skeletons shows these beings were virtually human, dying 25,000 years ago from radiation poisoning.  The team then adjourns to the cave to hear Anna's translation.  Finding the lyrical prose difficult, the girl haltingly recites the 'Testament of Arkadia'.  The ancient text reveals this civilisation annihilated itself in a nuclear war, but, in spite of the destruction, it affirms that Arkadia will live on—in the hearts of an enlightened few who fled before the end, carrying the seeds of a new beginning into the depths of space.  The passage ends with a plea for those guided here to make this world live again.

Overwhelmed, the Alphans cannot reconcile the presence of human skeletons and an ancient human language uncountable light-years from Earth.  Humans could not have travelled here over 25,000 years ago.  With a strange intensity, Ferro astounds everyone by asserting it was the Arkadians who travelled to Earth.  He reveals Anna's untold discovery:  the petrified remains of forty varieties of tree thought native to Earth.  As stated in the inscription, the Arkadian survivors took the seeds with them...when they settled Earth and became Mankind.

Shaken by the implications of Ferro's conclusion, they move outside to discuss their situation:  Alpha will be powerless in twenty-four hours and the team is no closer to discovering what force is holding the Moon a static prisoner.  Should they migrate to the planet, it will take two years to reclaim the soil and begin growing crops.  The overwhelming problem is that, even with strict rationing, three hundred Alphan settlers will exhaust the current supply of food in six months' time.  Koenig reckons the planet buys them time...enough to hope for a miracle.

In the cave, Ferro and Anna are packing their gear.  They are distracted by a prolonged, eerie chord, building in intensity.  Though frightened, the pair is drawn to the skeletons—which they briefly perceive as flesh-and-blood men.  A long-dormant intelligence has been activated, choosing this man and woman to be the agents of its will.  During a silent dialogue, the couple's fear turns to understanding and elation.  After the communion concludes, Ferro and Anna are empowered by a new purpose.  The pair joyfully embrace when Koenig calls with the news he has decided to abandon Alpha.

As the party breaks camp and departs for home, the power situation on Moonbase becomes desperate.  Most activities and services are severely curtailed, if not cancelled.  Lighting and heat are radically reduced and all personnel wear cold-weather gear.  With the power loss at forty-five percent, Paul Morrow argues with Bob Mathias that the extra heating allocated to the Medical Section must be withdrawn.  Once in radio range, Koenig calls to order Operation Exodus put into action.  As Morrow complies, Sandra Benes interrupts with unexpected news—the power loss has stabilised at fifty percent.

Koenig suspends the evacuation, pending his return.  Ferro and Anna are disturbed by this development and its potential effect on their new agenda.  Once on Alpha, Koenig questions their chances of survival with a permanent fifty-percent power loss.  When the experts confirm the food-production and life-support systems can cope with the situation, Koenig cancels Operation Exodus.  After the announcement, Ferro and Anna confront the overstressed Commander.  Citing that destiny has carried them here to revitalise this planet, they request permission to settle on Arkadia...just the two of them.

Koenig refuses; they would need to take half the current food supply with them to survive—condemning Alpha to starvation.  When they persist, he harshly dismisses them.  However, the fanatical pair have a back-up plan.  Anna makes for the Supply Section as Ferro casually approaches David Kano.  Unseen by the Main Mission staff, Ferro jams his gun into Kano's ribs, threatening to kill everyone in the room unless he is given the access code to the protein store.

Kano complies, and Ferro relays the sequence to his waiting accomplice.  After stunning the sentries, Anna uses the code to gain entry to the food stores.  Kano shoves Ferro off him and sounds the red-alert klaxon.  Making his way to an exit, Ferro encounters Helena and takes her hostage.  Bargaining with the doctor's life, Ferro demands an Eagle, a moon buggy and provisions sufficient for three years time.  Obsessed with the need to 'return life to its place of origin', Ferro and Anna reject all appeals to reason.

Unexpectedly, Koenig agrees to their demands.  He alone recognises the danger of the two fanatics—not to mention that of the alien force motivating them.  However, when boarding the Eagle, Ferro refuses to release Helena; she will stay with them to prevent any acts of reprisal.  The unarmed survey Eagle will accompany them to Arkadia.  Once safely out of range, the two will dock and Helena will be transferred to the other ship.  Any sign of pursuit and the doctor dies.  Again, Koenig acquiesces.  The Commander is shunned by Bergman and the others, as his apparent 'cowardice' has condemned them to starvation.

The two ships, with Carter piloting Reconnaissance Eagle Two, set off for Arkadia.  During the flight, Helena attempts to make Ferro and Anna see reason.  The fugitives, in turn, try to convince the doctor that they are neither mad nor brainwashed puppets.  Profoundly affected by their experience on the planet, they are willing servants of a higher destiny.  The return of life to Arkadia gives purpose to the Moon's odyssey...and if Alpha's role is that of sacrificial lamb, so be it.

After establishing orbit around Arkadia, the two ships dock and the exchange is made.  As Ferro descends to the surface, Carter sets course for home.  Once in radio range of Alpha, the astronaut reports that Helena is aboard and safe.  With that fact certain, Koenig redeems himself.  He reveals his secret order to place a homing transmitter on Ferro's Eagle.  In addition, Eagles Three and Five are standing by to lift off; their mission is to locate the fugitive ship and retrieve the supplies.

As Ferro touches down on Arkadia, the Moon unexpectedly lurches into motion.  Not coincidentally, the power loss begins to lessen.  Koenig cancels the pursuit mission; with full power returning, the lost supplies are irrelevant.  He immediately calls Carter, ordering him to hit the throttle so as not to be left behind.  On Arkadia, as Ferro and Anna unload the Eagle, they are shocked to see the Moon in motion.  The couple holds each other, watching the Moon dwindle in size.  Though completely alone on a barren world, they are comforted by the knowledge of having come home.

After Helena's safe return to Alpha, she and Koenig speculate on the role of the mysterious unknown force of Arkadia and its influence on Ferro and Anna.  The viewer returns to the present as Koenig concludes that, with Earth settlers returning life to Arkadia, events have come full circle.  While destiny may have been fulfilled with Luke Ferro and Anna Davis becoming a 21st-century Adam and Eve, he writes, the Alphans must keep faith that the Moon's ongoing journey has a greater purpose...

Cast

Starring
 Martin Landau — Commander John Koenig
 Barbara Bain — Doctor Helena Russell

Also Starring
 Barry Morse — Professor Victor Bergman

Guest Stars
 Orso Maria Guerrini — Luke Ferro
 Lisa Harrow — Anna Davis

Featuring
 Prentis Hancock — Controller Paul Morrow
 Clifton Jones — David Kano
 Zienia Merton — Sandra Benes
 Anton Phillips — Doctor Bob Mathias
 Nick Tate — Captain Alan Carter

Uncredited Artists
 Suzanne Roquette — Tanya
 Tony Allyn — Security Guard One (Irwin)
 Quentin Pierre — Security Guard Two (N'Dole)
 Sarah Bullen — Kate

Music

In addition to the regular Barry Gray score (drawn from "Breakaway" and "Another Time, Another Place"), excerpts from Paul Bonneau and Serge Lancen's composition Suite Appassionata—Andante are featured throughout the episode and Jack Arel and Pierre Dutour's 'Picture of Autumn' is used during Ferro and Anna's encounter with the Arkadian intelligence.

Production Notes

 Script editor Johnny Byrne and director David Tomblin worked closely together to craft this final episode—mostly, Byrne recalls, as there was little money left in the series' budget.  The idea of the 'ancient astronaut' was popularised by Swiss author Erich von Däniken in his book Chariots of the Gods? published in 1968.  Melding this premise with the spirituality of the Adam and Eve story of Creation excited Tomblin, but Byrne felt it was a little too 'on the nose' with the imposed religious context.  Though enjoying the story, he felt it was let down by the time limitations of the one-hour episode format and the necessary under-budgeting.  Fan response was positive, as the episode is seen to bring the (unintended) story arc of the Moon's predestined journey through space to a conclusion.
 Orso Maria Guerrini was the last of four Italian artists employed by the series as per an agreement with RAI, the Italian production company and series financial partner.  Guerrini's English proved difficult to understand and his dialogue was dubbed by renowned voice artist Robert Rietty.  Tony Allyn and Quentin Pierre had played unnamed Security guards throughout the series.  The script for this episode listed their surnames as 'Irwin' and 'N'Dole', though these were never spoken aloud.  Koenig's voice-over narration throughout the story was a last-minute addition, used to clarify several abstract plot points.
 Producer Sylvia Anderson felt that 'we were really just getting into our stride in this episode—episode twenty-four.  It was probably a little slower than some of the other episodes, but quite profound.  I think Johnny Byrne was taking a very interesting concept, and more to the point...we learned about the characters.'  However, her personal and professional partnership with husband Gerry Anderson came to an end soon after the conclusion of filming.  Before the wrap party, he made known his intentions of asking for a legal separation.  Afterwards, she resigned as both the programme's producer and a partner in the Group Three production company.
 It was decided hiring an American head writer would end the time-consuming necessity of ITC New York vetting the scripts (plus bring a more American outlook to the programme).  Experienced writer/producer Fred Freiberger would be selected for this position, mainly due to his position as show runner for the final season of Star Trek.  With the producer's chair now vacated by Sylvia Anderson, he would assume the dual position of head writer and producer.
 Though the programme was an international success, Sir Lew Grade was disappointed by the series' failure to secure an American network sale.  This was coupled with its lukewarm reception in Britain (due to the lack of a coordinated network showing on ITV and having been labelled an 'American import').  In the autumn of 1975, as work progressed on the second series, ITC Entertainment announced to the production team that, unless the format was drastically retooled (specifically favouring American viewers), Space: 1999 would be cancelled.

Novelisation

The episode was adapted in the sixth Year One Space: 1999 novel Astral Quest by John Rankine, published in 1975.

References

External links
Space: 1999 - "The Testament of Arkadia" - The Catacombs episode guide
Space: 1999 - "The Testament of Arkadia" - Moonbase Alpha's Space: 1999 page

1976 British television episodes
Space: 1999 episodes